The British National Team Sprint Championships are held annually as part of the British National Track Championships organized by British Cycling. A women's championship was held for the first time in 2008.

Results

Men

Women

See also
 British Cycling National Track Championships

References

Results 1999
Results 2000
Results 2001
Results 2002
Team sprint results 2002–2005
Senior & Disability results 2006
2009 Day 4, Evening session
2010 Day 1, Men's team sprint results
2010 Day 2, Women's team sprint results
2011 Day 5, Men's team sprint results
2011 Day 4, Women's team sprint results

Cycle racing in the United Kingdom
National track cycling championships
National championships in the United Kingdom
Annual sporting events in the United Kingdom